Camilo Andrés Gómez Archila (born 5 October 1984 in Sogamoso, Boyacá) is a Colombian former professional road racing cyclist.

Major results

2003
1st Stage 1 Vuelta a Colombia Under-23
2005
10th Overall Clásico RCN
2007
3rd Overall Clasica del Meta
1st Stage 1
2010
 1st Prologue (TTT) Vuelta al Valle del Cauca
2011
 1st Stage 1 (TTT) Vuelta a Antioquia
 4th Overall Vuelta Ciclista de Chile
 9th Overall Tour de San Luis
 9th Overall Vuelta a Colombia
2012
 1st Stage 8 Clásico RCN
 1st Stage 4 Vuelta a Boyacá
 1st Stage 2 Vuelta a Cundinamarca
 10th Overall Vuelta a Bolivia
1st Stage 3 (TTT)
2013
 1st  Overall Clásico RCN
 3rd Overall Vuelta a Boyacá
2014
 1st  Overall Vuelta a Antioquia
 1st Stage 1 Vuelta al Ecuador
2015
 1st Stage 3 Clásico RCN
 4th Overall Vuelta a Colombia
1st Stage 7
2016
 9th Overall Vuelta a Colombia

References
 

1984 births
Living people
Colombian male cyclists
Sportspeople from Boyacá Department
21st-century Colombian people